The Wannabes is an American television sitcom, created by Doreen Spicer-Dannelly (of Disney Channel's Jump In! and The Proud Family), which follows the lives of classical performing arts high school students who want to be popstars. The six stars of the series are from the pop recording group, Savvy. Despite not having been produced or filmed in Australia, the series premiered on June 14, 2010, on both ABC1 and ABC3 in a "tween" oriented timeslot. Pay-TV channel Starz Kids & Family picked up U.S. rights.

Plot 
The Wannabes follows six high school students attending an arts academy boarding school in hope that they will become popstars, until they realize the oppressive academy only teaches classical music and dance. Throughout the series they face issues about their careers, normal teen lives and are always trying to avoid their mean principal at every cost because he loves detentions.

Cast 
Shaylen Carroll as Shaylen Carlson
Mariah Parks as Mariah Pettigrew
Andrew Stern as Andrew Stark
Gabrielle “GiGi” LeMaire as Sarah Moody
Drew Reinartz as Drew Robinson
Alan Shaw as Alan Taskin
Steven J. Scott as Mr. Moody
David LaDuca as Mr. Pesckow

Production 
The filming for seasons 1 and 2 began on August 3, 2009 in Howell, Michigan. 26 episodes were filmed. Filming was proposed to be done in Houston, Texas. The school they film at is Parker High School campus in Michigan. The series is produced by Savvy Productions, LLC and Stern-LeMaire Productions Inc., and distributed by Bradford Licensing LLC. One of the producers, Christine LeMaire, explained the series is not going to be a Disney Channel original series, "No, it is an independent production licensed to overseas networks."

Series overview

Episodes

Season 1: 2009–10

Season 2: 2010–2011

International Broadcasts

Related shows 
Kids Incorporated
Hannah Montana
Saved By the Bell

References

External links

2000s American high school television series
2000s American musical comedy television series
2000s American teen sitcoms
2010s American high school television series
2010s American musical comedy television series
2010s American teen sitcoms
2009 American television series debuts
2011 American television series endings
Starz original programming
Television series about teenagers
Television shows set in Michigan